Houston Christian University (HCU), formerly Houston Baptist University, is a private Baptist university in Houston, Texas. It is affiliated with the Baptist General Convention of Texas (Southern Baptist Convention). Its Cultural Arts Center houses three museums: the Dunham Bible Museum, the Museum of American Architecture and Decorative Arts, and the Museum of Southern History.

History
The university was founded in 1960 by the Baptist General Convention of Texas as Houston Baptist College. In 1973, it became a university.  The university announced a name change from Houston Baptist University to its current name in September 2022.

Accreditation 
It is affiliated with the Baptist General Convention of Texas (Southern Baptist Convention).

Campus
It is located in Sharpstown Section 3A, within the Southwest Management District (formerly Greater Sharpstown) in Houston, Texas, near the Southwest Freeway.

According to the Houston Convention and Visitors Bureau, the land housing HBU is in the Chinatown area.

Campus housing 
The Reuben & Rebecca Bates Philips Residence Colleges for Men and Women are two separate residence hall facilities for freshmen, with each serving one gender.
The Sadie & Doug Hodo Residence College is the largest single residential building on campus that houses both genders on opposing sides of the building. 
Husky Village, seven apartment buildings with various layouts, are usually reserved for the university and house mostly upper classmen and staff.

Community life and worship 

Eighty Community Life and Worship Credits (CLW Credits) are required for graduation from HBU. Transfer students are also allotted 0.75 CLW Credits for each credit hour transferred into the university. CLW Credits may be accrued from a variety of opportunities including: campus service, a weekly traditional chapel service known as Convocation, a weekly student-led contemporary worship service known as Quest, small group Bible studies, lecture series and through the Assisting Communities Through Students office which coordinates community service and volunteer work in the Houston community. The on-campus "Community Life and Worship" biyearly magazine lists the different opportunities through which students may earn CLW Credits. The spiritual life office also awards credits for students who participate in church or university sponsored mission trips.

The university applies a 2017 exemption of aspects of Title IX which prevents the forceful of accommodation of LGBT students on religious grounds. University president Robert Sloan has stated that special civil rights protections for people who engage in homosexuality are unnecessary because like "a tendency towards arson or theft" homosexuality is a sinful tendency that stems from a person's individual and therefore chosen "behavior."

Athletics 

The Houston Christian athletic teams are called the Huskies. The university is a member of the Division I level of the National Collegiate Athletic Association (NCAA), primarily competing in the Southland Conference for most of its sports since the 2013–14 academic year; while its men's soccer team competes in the Western Athletic Conference (WAC). The Huskies previously competed the D-I Great West Conference from 2008–09 to 2012–13 after spending one season as an NCAA D-I Independent during the 2007–08 school year (since returning back to NCAA D-I as a transitional member); in the Red River Athletic Conference (RRAC) of the National Association of Intercollegiate Athletics (NAIA) from 1998–99 to 2006–07; and as an NAIA Independent from 1989–90 to 1997–98. Houston Christian's (HCU) official school colors are royal blue and orange.

HCU competes in 17 intercollegiate varsity sports: Men's sports include baseball, basketball, cross country, football, golf, soccer and track and field (indoor and outdoor); while women's sports include basketball, beach volleyball, cross country, golf, soccer, softball, track and field (indoor and outdoor) and volleyball.

Football
Houston Christian's American football program began in 2013.

Baseball
The HCU baseball team participated in the 2015 NCAA Baseball Tournament, winning the Southland Conference tournament championship in Sugar Land, Texas, and advanced to the Houston Regional, hosted by the University of Houston. The Huskies also won the Great West's final championship at the 2013 GWC Baseball Tournament.

Women's soccer
The HCU women's soccer team participated in the 2014 NCAA Tournament, winning the Southland Conference tournament championship in Beaumont, Texas, before falling to No. 5 Texas A&M in the first round.

The HCU women's soccer team made their second appearance in the NCAA tournament in 2016 after winning the Southland Conference tournament championship in Corpus Christi, Texas. They fell to No. 1 Stanford in the first round.

Women's basketball
During the 2016 Southland Conference women's basketball tournament, senior Anna Strickland posted 21 points, 31 rebounds, eight assists, and seven blocked shots in the Huskies' first-round loss to Lamar University. Her 31 rebounds broke the Southland Conference single-game record, established a new tournament record, and were the most rebounds in Division I women's basketball in 2016. Strickland's all-around stat sheet has not been achieved in men's or women's Division I basketball or the NBA in the past twenty years.

Men's soccer
Two student athletes have earned CoSIDA Academic All-American status: volleyball's Allison Doerpinghaus and men's soccer's Bryan Brody. Both students earned the honor in 2015. They join numerous student-athletes who have earned CoSIDA Academic All-District and academic all-conference honors, and numerous Academic All-American at the NIAA level.

Achievements
Notable NCAA D-I athletic achievements: 
 1983 NCAA high-jump champion, Ricky Thompson; t-32nd place in the 1983 Track & Field Championships
 Alma Mater of European Tour great Colin Montgomerie
 1983-84 Men's basketball team participated in the NCAA tournament in the play-in game vs. Alcorn State; 1983-84 Men's basketball team led the entire NCAA in team field-goal percentage, shooting 55.2% - this is also tenth all-time in NCAA history
 Participants in the NCAA men's golf championships in 1984, 1987 (5th place), and 1988
 Participants in the NCAA men's gymnastics championships in 1982 (10th place) and 1987 (7th place); 1987 men's gymnastics (Rings) champion, Paul O'Neill
 1982, 83, 84, 85 Trans-America (now Atlantic Sun) Men's soccer Champions, and conference tournament champions in 82, 84, and 85
 1982, 83, 84, 85 Trans-America (now Atlantic Sun) men's cross country champions; individual titles won by Charlie Foreman (83 & 84) and Magnus Fyhr (85)

Notable NAIA athletic achievements:
 2007 NAIA Baseball World Series, third place; 2007 Baseball Region VI Champions
 Participants in NAIA Men's Basketball Tournament ten straight seasons from 1997 to 2007
 Dwight Jones II, son of Dwight Jones Sr. who played on the 1972 USA Olympic Silver medal basketball team in Munich, was drafted by the Tulsa 66ers of the NBA Developmental League as well as the East Kentucky Miners in the CBA draft

Gallery

Notable alumni 
Voddie Baucham, Jr.  Pastor, preacher, author, apologist, and current Dean of Theology at African Christian University
Van G. Garrett, Poet
Colin Montgomerie, Professional Golfer
Elliot Segal, DJ host of Elliot in the Morning (did not graduate)
Jerreth Sterns, NFL Player
Bailey Zappe, NFL Player

References

Further reading
 Looser, Donald William. "An Act of Providence: A History of Houston Baptist University 1960-2010." Pearland, Halcyon Press, Ltd., 2010.

External links

 
 Houston Christian athletics website

 
Universities and colleges affiliated with the Baptist General Convention of Texas
Universities and colleges affiliated with the Southern Baptist Convention
Universities and colleges in Houston
Educational institutions established in 1960
Universities and colleges accredited by the Southern Association of Colleges and Schools
1960 establishments in Texas
Council for Christian Colleges and Universities
Private universities and colleges in Texas